Parathelphusa convexa is a species of gecarcinucid crab. It is native to Java, and lives on rice paddies and rivers.

Description 
They have a dark brown trapezium-shaped carapace with three teeth and small eyes, with the third maxilliped closed shut.

Uses 
The corpses of this crab is used as a pest control as its smell attracts Leptocorisa oratoria, which eats rice ears.

References 

Gecarcinucidae
Crustaceans described in 1879
Freshwater crustaceans of Asia